ASAN Imza (Easy signature), established by Azerbaijani's Ministry of Taxes in partnership with ASAN Service Center and Ministry of Communication and Technologies, is service that allows a client to use a mobile phone as a form of secure electronic ID.

Like the ID Card, it can be used for accessing secure e-services and digitally signing documents, but does not require an ID card reader. The system is based on a specialized Mobile-ID SIM card which the customer requests from the mobile phone operator. Private keys are stored on the mobile SIM card along with a small application for authentication and signing.

Asan İmza (Mobile ID) is the first step toward Ubiquitous government in Azerbaijan – U-government, which can be viewed as a comprehensive set of e-government. It reflects new forms of interaction and transaction that are possible anywhere and at any time on various devices, due to the pervasive availability of networks, applications and services.

Awards
 Global mobileGov (2017)

References

 ASAN Service official page
 ASAN Imza official page

See also
ASAN service

E-government by country
2013 establishments in Azerbaijan